The 2016 Arizona Bowl (known as the 2016 NOVA Home Loans Arizona Bowl for sponsorship reasons) was a postseason college football bowl game played between the South Alabama Jaguars and the Air Force Falcons played on December 30, 2016, at Arizona Stadium in Tucson, Arizona. It was the second edition of the Arizona Bowl and the final game of the 2016 NCAA Division I FBS football season for both teams.

Teams

South Alabama

Air Force

Game summary

Scoring summary

Statistics

References

External links
 Box score at ESPN
 Air Force defeats South Alabama, 45–21, to win the Nova Home Loans Arizona Bowl via YouTube

2016–17 NCAA football bowl games
2016
2016 Arizona Bowl
2016 Arizona Bowl
2016 in sports in Arizona
December 2016 sports events in the United States